Elma Lewis School of Fine Arts (ELSFA) was founded in 1950 by Elma Lewis. The school, based in Roxbury, Boston, provided classes in a variety of artistic, social, and cultural topics, including art, dance, drama, music, and costuming. Lewis founded the school with the intention of promoting "programs of cultural enrichment for the benefit of deprived children" in  Roxbury, Dorchester and throughout the Greater Boston area. The school closed at its Elm Hill Avenue location following an arson fire in 1985.

Elma Lewis
Elma Ina Lewis (September 15, 1921 – January 1, 2004) was born and raised in Boston, Massachusetts. An alumna of Emerson College, Elma was a prominent American arts educator. Her work with the African American community in the arts, as well as her dedication to social service, resulted in her being one of the first recipients of the MacArther Fellows Grant in 1981. She also received a Presidential Medal for the Arts from President Ronald Reagan in 1983. Elma was also the recipient of 28 honorary doctorate degrees. Elma Lewis died in 2004 at the age of 82.

Opening
Elma Lewis opened the Elma Lewis School of Fine Arts in 1950. Its original location was a rented 6-room apartment at 7 Waumbeck Street in Roxbury, Massachusetts. The school was created with the purpose of providing African-American community members in the Boston area with an education in the arts.

On its first day of operation in 1950, 25 students enrolled in classes. In order to enroll, students had to pay a $5 monthly tuition.

The ELSFA was incorporated as a non-profit on October 19, 1966. At the time of incorporation, Elma Lewis was the secretary, Ruth Batson served as the chairman, and Darnley Corbin was acting treasurer.  The school received its first federal grant that year.

Location

By 1955, the school's attendance outgrew its rented space and relocated to 449 Blue Hill Avenue. Following its move, enrollment reached 250 students – ten times the original class. However, located between a store and a "questionable social club," the Blue Hill space was unfavorable.

In 1964, the school signed a rental contract for a building on Charlotte Street in Dorchester, MA. However, after only two seasons, the building was bought by a fundamentalist church. The lease was terminated and the school "was asked to move."

After spending 1966 at the Lewis Junior High School, the school moved to the Hecht House in Boston during its 1967 summer season. It was during this season that Lewis began the Playhouse in the Park Series.

The following year, the ELSFA moved to the former home of Congregation Mishkan Tefila, on the corner of Elm Hill Avenue and Seaver Street. The building was bought by the owners of the New England Hebrew Academy and then the property was gifted to the ELSFA. It was the only black arts organization to have acquired property at the time. The school would end up converting twenty rooms at the Elm Hill property, formerly the synagogue's Hebrew school and community center, a project which cost $2,000,000. That year, Lewis started the National Center of Afro-American Artists.

National Center of Afro-American Artists

Elma Lewis founded the National Center of Afro-American Artists (NCAAA) in 1968 to "preserv[e] and foster[] the cultural arts heritage of black peoples worldwide through arts teaching, and the presentation of professional works in all fine arts disciplines." After its founding, the NCAAA assumed administrative responsibilities for the ELSFA and became its "intellectual dimension". The NCAAA runs a variety of cultural programs and exhibitions, and it opened the Museum of the National Center of Afro-American Artists in 1980.

Notable programming

Playhouse in the Park

In 1966, the same year that the ELSFA was incorporated as a non-profit, Elma Lewis began the Playhouse in the Park program, "a summer theater in Franklin Park" located in Boston.   
The program was inspired by Joseph Papp's New York Shakespeare Festival. Audiences for the nightly shows were between 100 and 3,000 people.

The program would continue annually until 1977, running "nightly from July 4 through Labor Day". Over 100,000 attended shows during the first season. Throughout its run, the Playhouse often featured major celebrities, including Duke Ellington and Babatunde Olatunji. The series was reincarnated in 2002, and continues in Boston every summer. The revived program continues to feature classic arts, but "the scope of the performers has broadened to include Chinese and Irish dance, music from Brazil and the Caribbean, and ballet, hip- hop, and tap dance."

MCI Norfolk Prison Theatre

The ELSFA began the Technical Theater Training Program (TTP) at MCI, Norfolk, during July 1970. Over the course of its duration, 140 inmates were enrolled in courses teaching drama, playwriting, music, and dance. During the program, ten inmates collaborated and wrote a book titled "Who Took the Weight," published by Little Brown.

Students and alumni

Between 1958 and 1963, eight former ELSFA students moved to New York and worked professionally on Broadway. Four students were among the members of the cast for the 1969 Pearl Bailey-led "Hello Dolly." Others were cast in productions such as the Broadway production of Ben Franklin Goes to Paris, and Golden Boy starring Sammy Davis Jr.  American novelist Danzy Senna, attended the school as a child in the late-1970s. In 1964 and 1965, teenaged students from the ELSFA participated in the World's Fair in New York City.

Operational difficulties

In 1966, the ELSFA was given a grant of $3,500 by the National Endowment for the Arts, to "teach art, dance, music and drama to public school children" attending the Lewis Junior High School in Roxbury. However, despite the fact that the Boston School Committee voted to open the ELFSA to all Boston public school students, the BPS's Business Agent evicted the school from the Junior High school, leaving it once more without a base location.

In 1967, while classes were not in session, the ELSFA was funded "by donations provided through the network of Elwood McKenny, the presiding justice of the Roxbury District Court."  During this time, the administrators held meetings to determine the direction the school would take, while continuing to look for permanent housing.

In the early 1970s, the NCAAA launched a program called CELEBRATE! to help fund building upkeep and salaries. It would end up running from 1971 to 1973.

In 1971, Elma Lewis was accused by the Jewish Survival Legion of "horrendous crimes against Jewish people," beginning a two-decade long court battle with a series of appeals and victories on both sides.

In 1980, the school was in significant financial distress. Enrollment had plummeted, from a high of 525 students to a mere 100. The ELSFA was "facing a sizable debt, [and] experiencing an acute staff shortage". Michael Washburn and Associates were hired to prescribe a four-year plan to the financially struggling institution. They determined that "the ELSFA conceptualization requires an annual budget of approximately $1 million for its optimal operation".

That year, the Kennedy Foundation gave the ELSFA a grant that offset building repair costs, but only for a year.

Arson fires
The Elma Lewis School of Fine Arts faced a series of unsolved arson fires throughout the 1970s and 1980s. The 1970s fires failed to do significant damage, and most of the records from this decade survived. One was attributed to a kiln that had been left on all night. However, the fires in the 1980s contributed to some records being destroyed. An incident in 1985 was especially troubling, when flaming materials were thrown into a classroom during a rehearsal.

References

Roxbury, Boston
Schools in Boston
Art schools in Massachusetts
African-American history in Boston
African-American arts organizations
1950 establishments in Massachusetts